The Overspent American: Upscaling, Downshifting, and the New Consumer is a 1998 book by Juliet Schor on American consumer spending patterns.

Bibliography

External links 

 Full text from the Internet Archive

1998 non-fiction books
Basic Books books
Books by Juliet Schor
English-language books